Hylands School is a coeducational secondary school and sixth form located in Chelmsford, in the English county of Essex.

See also
List of schools in Essex

References

External links
School website

Academies in Essex
Secondary schools in Essex
Schools in Chelmsford